Shahediyeh (also Romanized as Shāhedīyeh) is a city in the Central District of Yazd County, Yazd province, Iran. At the 2006 census, its population was 14,374 in 3,773 households. The following census in 2011 counted 16,571 people in 4,845 households. The latest census in 2016 showed a population of 18,309 people in 5,524 households.

References 

Yazd County

Cities in Yazd Province

Populated places in Yazd Province

Populated places in Yazd County